Nesophila may refer to:
 Nesophila (gastropod), a genus of gastropods in the family Endodontidae
 Nesophila (alga), a genus of red algae in the family Rhizophyllidaceae
 Nesophila, a genus of butterflies in the family Geometridae, synonym of Solomonophila